Shadowdance is the first solo album by English saxophonist Chris White, who had previously performed with Dire Straits and The Notting Hillbillies.

Track listing

 "Control
 "Mr. Fats"
 "A New Day"
 "Shadowdance"
 "Don't Take No"
 "Jericho Walls"
 "Eve's Song"
 "You Will"
 "Dreamtime"
 "Brilliant Silence"
 "A Way of Life"

Personnel

 Chris White - Alto, Tenor, Soprano, Electric Saxophones                       
 Mark Knopfler - Guitar                      
 Danny Schogger - Keyboards, Producer        
 Andy Scott - Guitar                 
 Danny Cummings- Percussions   
 Pino Palladino - Bass        
 Hugh Burns - Guitar            
Gary Husband - Drums    
Jean-Paul 'Bluey' Maunick - Arrangements    
Sam Brown - Vocals
Andy Caine - Vocals
Brian Powell - Vocals
Felix Krish - Bass        
Robert Berry - Guitar        
Mike Mainieri - Vibes

Chris White (saxophonist) albums
1991 albums
Bellaphon Records albums